The TT Grandstand including the startline, pit lane, re-fuellers, merchandising, scoreboard and paddocks for the Isle of Man TT and Manx Grand Prix races is situated on the A2 Glencrutchery Road, in the town of Douglas, Isle of Man.

History
The startline for the 1911 TT races was originally situated on a level section of the A2 Quarterbridge Road between Selborne Drive and Woodlands Lodge in Douglas.

The startline and refuelling area was moved to the top of Bray Hill for the 1914 TT races, and then moved in 1920 to the Nobles Park area of the A2 Glencrutchery Road at the junction of Greenfield Road in Douglas.

For the 1920 TT races, changes were made to the Snaefell Mountain Course and competitors turned left at Cronk-ny-Mona and followed the primary A18 Mountain Road to Governor's Bridge Dip with the new start/finish line nearby on the A2 Glencrutchery Road which lengthened the course to 37¾ miles.

For the 1926 Isle of Man TT races the startline section at Glencrutchery Road was improved by road widening and building of a new grandstand complex at a cost of £2,000.

The 1920s wooden structure was demolished and replaced with a modern purpose-built brick design on newly acquired land for the 1986 TT Races. The new development incorporated a race control and communications tower, a wider pit-lane and seating placed  further away from the refuellers due to FIM requirements for enhanced competitor and spectator safety concerning fire-risk. 

Proposals to re-locate the facility to the other side of the Glencrutchery Road were rejected as being more costly than the projection of £GB450,000.

Concourse facilities

The official TT regulations paddock diagram shows many public, technical and administrative areas developed into the Grandstand, including:

Acceleration/deceleration lane and return road

The acceleration lane leads from the pit lane to re-join the main road. The deceleration lane provides a braking area, terminating in a hairpin turn-around loop in Nobles Park before connecting to the return road, leading back to the winners enclosure and parc fermé, situated as part of the paddock complex, for all race finishers.

Temporary accommodation

Temporary holiday accommodation in the paddock for TT time was established from 2012 until 2017. The complex was provided by Snoozebox, a business having former Formula 1 racing driver David Coulthard as a principle. 

The accommodation was in the form of   stacked shipping containers, modified and fitted-out as commodious sleep cells.

Sources

External links
 Map of course
TT Grandstand, paddock and campsite section 11 of Noble’s Park 5-Year Development Plan 2012-2017, Douglas Borough Council

TT Grandstand
Snaefell Mountain Course